Credence can refer to:

 credence good in economics, a good whose value is hard for a consumer to ascertain
 letter of credence, a letter sent by one head of state to another formally accrediting a named individual, usually but not always a diplomat
 credence table, a small side-table used in the Christian ceremony of the Eucharist
 "Credence", a song by Opeth from their third album My Arms, Your Hearse
 Credence Systems Corporation, a manufacturer of automatic test equipment (ATE) for analog, digital, memory, mixed-signal and wireless semiconductor devices
 Creedence Clearwater Revival, a rock band led by John Fogerty
 Credence (film), a 2015 British sci-fi film directed by Mike Buonaiuto
 Credence (novel), a 2013 graphic novel by Michael Easton 
 Credence (statistics), a measure of belief strength used in statistics
Credence Barebone, character from the Wizarding World films